Memorial Davide Fardelli — Cronometro Individuale was a women's senior and men's under-23 time trial cycle race which took place in Italy and was ranked by the UCI as 1.2.

Previous winners

Men

Women

References

Cycle races in Italy
Defunct cycling races in Italy